Handy Dan Home Improvement was an American home improvement store based out of New Jersey.  It went out of business in May, 1989.  

Bernard Marcus was CEO of Handy Dan in 1978 when he was fired along with company vice president Arthur Blank amid a corporate power struggle with Sanford C. Sigoloff, who led Handy Dan's owner at the time, Daylin Inc. Marcus and Blank went on to found Home Depot. 

Daylin was purchased by W. R. Grace and Company in 1979. In 1986, Grace's retail home improvement division, which included Handy Dan and Channel Home Centers, was sold to the division's executives through a leveraged buyout. 

Handy Dan played a major role in getting Texas's religion-based blue laws repealed in 1984 by opening on Sunday and using white price stickers for 
goods that could be sold seven days a week, and 
blue price stickers for items that could not be sold on Sunday.

References

Retail companies disestablished in 1989
Hardware stores of the United States
Defunct retail companies of the United States
Defunct companies based in New Jersey
The Home Depot